Chain of Strength is a straight edge hardcore punk band from Southern California that had its heyday in the late 1980s and early 1990s.

Biography 

The first Chain of Strength release was a 7" EP entitled True Till Death, released through Revelation Records. After parting ways with Revelation, they formed their own Foundation Records to release another 7", What Holds Us Apart. Both of these records eventually fell out of print, yet were still in demand. As a result, Revelation Records released both EPs (plus one unreleased track) as a CD/LP called The One Thing That Still Holds True.

Both EP's were released in the UK on First Strike Records, a record label based in Wigan, run from a skate shop called Alans.

From 2006-2008, Alex Barreto played bass for the band Alien Ant Farm. Currently, he is the guitarist of Excel.

Members
Curt Canales - Vocals
Ryan Hoffman - Guitar
Chris Bratton - Drums
Alex Barreto - Bass
Frosty Crunch (Paul Hertz) - Guitar

Discography
True Till Death 7" (Revelation Records)
What Holds Us Apart 7" (Foundation Records) (image shown is of First Strike European 1st pressing,2nd pressing of 1500 is on blue vinyl/blue cover)
The One Thing That Still Holds True  CD/LP/Cassette (Revelation Records)

References

External links
Chain of Strength at MySpace

Hardcore punk groups from California
Straight edge groups
Revelation Records artists